The Embassy of the United States in El Salvador is located in Antiguo Cuscatlán. The Ambassador of the United States to El Salvador is Ronald Douglas Johnson from 2019 to 2021.

The U.S. Embassy was established in San Salvador, the capital of El Salvador, on March 23, 1943, when the Legation was raised to the status of Embassy. Walter Thurston was promoted to U.S. Ambassador Extraordinary and Plenipotentiary and presented his credentials to the Government of El Salvador on April 16, 1943.

References

External links
  Embassy of the United States in San Salvador, El Salvador official website
  Embassy of the United States in El Salvador @ Facebook
  Embassy of the United States in El Salvador @ Twitter

United States
San Salvador
El Salvador–United States relations